Pterygoplichthys joselimaianus is a species of armored catfish endemic to Brazil where it occurs in the Tocantins River basin. It grows to a length of  SL.

References

Hypostominae
Fish of South America
Fish of Brazil
Endemic fauna of Brazil
Fish described in 1991